Michael John Loughnane (born 1867, date of death unknown) was an Australian politician.

He was born at Wombat. A Catholic farmer, little is known of his life. In 1894 he was contested the seat of Grenfell for the Labor Party, losing by two votes to the Free Trade candidate George Greene. Following a recount, Loughnane was instead declared elected and took his seat as the member, but he did not contest the 1895 election.

References

 

1867 births
Year of death missing
Members of the New South Wales Legislative Assembly
Australian Labor Party members of the Parliament of New South Wales